Kazan Cathedral House, also widely known as the house of the clergy of the Kazan Cathedral, is a historic building in Saint Petersburg, Russia.
The building was built in 1813-1817 in the style of Russian Neoclassicism. Architects—Vasily Stasov, Andrey Voronikhin. Before the Russian Revolution, the house belonged to the clergy of the Kazan Cathedral (since 1813).
Location: St. Petersburg, Nevsky Prospect, 25 & Kazanskaya street, 1. Regional object of cultural heritage.

Bibliography
 Кириков Б.М., Кирикова Л.А., Петрова О.В. Невский проспект. — Москва, Санкт-Петербург: Центрполиграф, МиМ-Дельта, 2004.
 Божерянов И. Н. Невский проспект. Культурно-исторический очерк двухвековой жизни C-Петербурга. Юбилейное издание. [В двух томах (пяти выпусках)]. — СПб.: Поставщик Двора Е. И. В. А. И. Вильборг, [1901-1903]. Том 1. Вып.1-2. (1901—1902). [4], IX, 185, 8, LXVI с. с илл.; 33 л. илл. и факсимиле. Том 2. Вып.3-5. (1902—1903). — С. 191-467, 9-14, III, LXVII-LXXVIII с. с илл.; 40 л. илл.

Gallery

References 

Buildings and structures completed in 1817
Nevsky Prospekt
Buildings and structures in Saint Petersburg
Cultural heritage monuments of federal significance in Saint Petersburg